Virginia Page Fortna is an American political scientist,  a specialist in the study of peace negotiations. She is currently the Harold Brown Professor of U.S. Foreign and Security Policy at Columbia University. She is the recipient of the 2010 Karl Deutsch Award from the International Studies Association.

Biography 
Fortna received her B.A. from Wesleyan University in 1990 and her Ph.D. from Harvard University in 1998. Her research has focused on terrorism, the durability of peace, and conflict termination. Her research on peacekeeping has shown that interventions involving peacekeeping is capable of reinforcing peace agreements and reducing the likelihood of wars being re-ignited. Her research on terrorism reveals that terrorism usually fails, as non-terrorist movements are far more likely to win a settlement or a victory during civil conflicts, while groups that resort to systematic and indiscriminate violence are less likely to win or hold territory.

She is the recipient of the 2010 Karl Deutsch Award, presented annually by the International Studies Association to an international relations scholar under the age 40, or within ten years of defending his or her dissertation, who is judged to have made, the most significant contribution to the study of International Relations and Peace Research. She chaired the Columbia University political science department from 2013 to 2016. She was elected to the American Academy of Arts and Sciences in 2021.

References 

Wesleyan University alumni
Harvard University alumni
Columbia University faculty
American women academics
American women political scientists
American political scientists
Year of birth missing (living people)
Living people